Official results after judicial recounts.

Abbreviations Guide:
Animal All. - Animal Alliance Environment Voters Party
AOTN - Alliance of the North
BQ - Bloc Québécois
Canada - Canada Party
CAP - Canadian Action Party
CHP - Christian Heritage Party
Comm. - Communist Party
Conservative - Conservative Party
DAPC - Democratic Advancement Party
Green - Green Party
Ind. - Independent
Liberal - Liberal Party
Libert. - Libertarian Party
Mar. - Marijuana Party
M-L - Marxist–Leninist Party
NA - No Affiliation
NDP - New Democratic Party
PACT - Party for Accountability, Competency and Transparency
PC - Progressive Canadian Party
Pirate - Pirate Party
Rhino. - Rhinoceros Party
SD - Strength in Democracy
Seniors - Seniors Party
TBP - The Bridge Party
United - United Party
All candidate names are those on the official list of confirmed candidates; names in media or on party website may differ slightly.
Names in boldface type represent party leaders.
† represents that the incumbent is not running again.
§ represents that the incumbent was defeated for nomination.
₰ represents that the incumbent was disqualified from their nomination contest.
‡ represents that the incumbent is running in a different district.
(judicial recount) indicates that results have been certified by a judge following a judicial recount; all other totals are those validated by the Returning Officer.

Newfoundland and Labrador

Prince Edward Island

Nova Scotia

New Brunswick

Quebec

Eastern Quebec

Côte-Nord and Saguenay

Quebec City

Central Quebec

Eastern Townships

Montérégie

Eastern Montreal

Western Montreal

Northern Montreal and Laval

Laurentides, Outaouais and Northern Quebec

Ontario

Ottawa

Eastern Ontario

Central Ontario

Southern Durham and York

Suburban Toronto

Central Toronto

Brampton, Mississauga and Oakville

Hamilton, Burlington and Niagara

Midwestern Ontario

Southwestern Ontario

Northern Ontario

Manitoba

Rural Manitoba

Winnipeg

Saskatchewan

Southern Saskatchewan

Northern Saskatchewan

Alberta

Rural Alberta

Edmonton and environs

Calgary

British Columbia

BC Interior

Fraser Valley and Southern Lower Mainland

Vancouver and Northern Lower Mainland

Vancouver Island

Nunavut

Northwest Territories

Yukon

See also
Results by riding of the Canadian federal election, 2011
Results by riding of the Canadian federal election, 2008
Results by riding of the Canadian federal election, 2006

Notes

References

2015 Canadian federal election